High Toynton is a village and civil parish in the East Lindsey district of Lincolnshire, England.

High Toynton is one of the Thankful Villages that did not suffer fatalities during the First World War.

Around the village has been found evidence of Medieval, Roman or earlier Neolithic and Bronze Age occupation.

In 1885 Kelly's noted the existence of a Wesleyan chapel, built in 1840. The Lord of the Manor was James Banks Stanhope DL JP of Revesby Abbey.

The parish church, dedicated to St John the Baptist, was rebuilt in 1872 of greenstone by Ewan Christian, who reused 12th-century fragments from the previous church erected in 1779. It is a Grade II listed building. The church tower collapsed in January 2020, and £200,000 National Lottery Heritage Funding towards rebuilding was allocated in July 2022.

There are two Grade II listed thatched dwellings in High Toynton: an 18th-century mud and stud cottage, and a similar red-brick-encased house.

References

External links

Villages in Lincolnshire
Civil parishes in Lincolnshire
East Lindsey District